Pena is a mono string instrument falling in the lute category, slightly similar to some of the traditional Indian stringed musical instruments such as the ravanahatha, ubo or the kenda. It is the traditional musical instrument of Manipur, used mainly in the Lai Haraoba festival of Sanamahism. Pena playing is becoming a dying art as only 145 active Pena players are reported in Manipur. The Center for Research on Traditional and Indigenous Art (Laihui), an organization headed by renowned pena player, Khangembam Mangi Singh has mandated vision to revive pena music.

History 
The Pena, one of the oldest traditional Meitei musical instruments, was once a part of luxurious living and was played at the royal gatherings in Kangleipak.

Uses 
Yaikairol (for people to make wake up)
Lai-eekouba (by doing this to start Lai-haraoba festivals)Khunung -Eesei (folk song)Luhongba (marriage)Wari-Liba (narrating story by using this musical instrument)PuYa Paba' (reading PuYa by using this musical instrument)

 Construction 
The main body is made out of bamboo, 10 to 11 inches long and 1 to 1.25 inches girth, which is fixed to a coconut shell cut in half, through two holes bore through the shell. Two additional holes are also drilled on the coconut shell for acoustic purposes, one of which is covered by dried animal skin such as iguana skin and the other, left open. The tension of the string is controlled by a bamboo peg, called kaan and is fitted inside a hole drilled on the bamboo rod. A scroll, mogra'', is also tied to the instrument tail.

The bow is wooden and bears a curved flourish at one end which is made of metal. In some parts, the bow also features tiny metal bells. The string is traditionally made of horse hair but, sometimes, metal strings and strings made out of wood fiber are also used.

Well-known performers 
 Khangembam Mangi Singh
 Guru N.G. Ibopishak
 Leimapokpam Yaima
 Mayanglambam Mangangsana

See also
 Music of Manipur
 Lute

References

External links
 
 

Indian musical instruments
Meitei culture
Meitei music
String instruments